Manoshi Nath is an Indian costume designer, who works jointly with Rushi Sharma in Bollywood films. Their team has earned Filmfare Award for Best Costume Design two times : 2009 and 2013.

Career
Manoshi is a Bengali, who was raised in Delhi. She did her schooling from Ramjas School. She met Rushi in 1998. Manoshi had assisted the lead designer as an apprentice for the film Parineeta (2005). She and Rushi together set up their company "Fools’ Paradise" in 2007. The next year they collaborated on Dibakar Banerjee’s Khosla Ka Ghosla. They had designed for Oye Lucky! Lucky Oye! the same year. It was a box-office disaster, but they went on to win Filmfare Award for Best Costume Design for their  work on it.  She later designed  films including Once Upon a Time in Mumbai (2010), Shanghai (2012), Talaash (2012) and Queen (2014), PK (2014), Detective Byomkesh Bakshi (2016), which became the highest grossing Bollywood film of all time, with nearly 754 crore INR. Her designs for Aamir Khan, Sanjay Dutt and Anushka Sharma  brought nationwide  recognition. Sanjay Dutt wore an Angarkha in typical Rajasthani prints, the Rajasthani Pagdi and Aviators. She and Rushi bought shirts and pants and went to small towns like Mandawa (Rajasthan). In 2015, they received Bollywood Style Award for Best Costume Design for their design provided for Kangana Ranaut who played a royal Indian Queen or Rani. They bought textiles from tiny gullies of Chandni Chowk, denim from the Mohan Singh Palace in Delhi and footwear from the Balli-Maran,  Delhi. In 2017, she and Rushi were scheduled to design dresses for Dangal, the highest grossing Indian film of all time. But co-producer Aamir Khan replaced them with Maxima Basu, the assistant director of Slumdog Millionaire, giving the reason that they charged too much money for the film's budget.

Awards

References

External links
 

Fashion stylists
Indian costume designers
Women artists from Assam
Filmfare Awards winners
Living people
Year of birth missing (living people)